The Hølendalen Bridges are three parallel concrete cantilever bridge which cross Hølendalen in Vestby, Norway. One carries two tracks of the Østfold Line, the other two carry four lanes of European Road E6.

Proposals for bridges were first made in 1988, as part of a joint planning of a new high-speed railway and freeway through Vestby. Johs Holt were the structural engineers and Lunde og Løvset architects. The railway bridge was built first and opened on 21 September 1996. The freeway bridges followed afterwards. They have won among other awards Betongtavlen in 1999.

Specifications
There are three bridges which cross Hølendalen. The easternmost carries two tracks of the Østfold Line. The two western bridges carry a combined four freeway lanes of European Road E6. At the southern end both the railway and freeway enter respective tunnels. This is the  Stavengåsen Tunnel for the railway and the twin-tubed Follo Tunnel for the freeway.

The three concrete cantilever bridges have the same span and length dimensions, with pillars located at the same relative points. This allows for a cleaner visual appearance. The two central spans each measure , while the inner spans measure . Each span was anchored at each end in a twin concrete pillar. There is a  gap between the twin pillars. All pillars are fastened into bedrock through a deep foundation.

The dimensions of the decks vary between the railway and road bridge. The former must tolerate a breaking force of 6 meganewtons (MN) at the same time as another train accelerates at 1 MN. For the road bridge the demand was only 750 kN. In addition there is a further  on the railway bridge for the ballast.

History

The Norwegian State Railways identified the Østfold Line between Ski Station and Moss Station as one of its prime bottlenecks in the 1940s. Proposals of rebuilding to double track were initially rejected by Parliament in 1950. The plans resurfaced in 1985, this time as a proposed section of double track from Tveter Station via Vestby Station to Kjenn Station. As NSB worked on the plans, it became increasingly clear that a small section of double track would not be sufficient, and that the whole section from Ski to Moss would need to be rebuilt. NSB initiated planning of the whole segment in 1988.

Planning of a new E6 through Vestby started in 1988. This planning was tied to that of the railway, which would allow the freeway and railway to run in parallel from just south of Vestby Station to past Sonsveien Station. NSB changed their original plans and cut the initial double tracking short at Rustad Station so that the section south of Rustad could be moved and planned along with the freeway. This also reflected the mentality change which took place during the railway planning. It was initially only thought of as a capacity increase, but soon NSB also wanted to increase the speed of the line. By the time the latter speed was approved, only the section between Rustad and Smørbekk, including the Hølendalen Bridge, was dimensioned for the latter speed.

The increased speed meant that a simple double of the existing track was no longer a viable option. In addition to sharp curvature, the railway went over the Hølen Viaduct over the town of Hølen. Planning on this project was therefore carried out jointly between NSB and the Public Roads Administration. Three routes were proposed, a western, middle and eastern route. The decision was finalized in 1993 with the western route selected. Important aspects were construction costs, minimizing the amount agricultural land which was taken and esthetics.

Structural design was contracted to Johs Holt, with the esthetic aspects were designed by Lunde og Løvset. Several designs were considered, with a concrete cantilever and a steel box girder the two finalists. The cantilever gave a stiffer construction and higher weight and would also be more dominant in the landscape.

Construction of the railway bridge was carried out first. It opened along with the rest of the railway between Rustad and to Sonsveien on 21 September 1996. Then the road bridges were built. The railway bridge cost 56 million Norwegian kroner, while the freeway bridges cost 118 million kroner. Both were within budget. The bridge won NSB's architectural award for 1997 and all three Betongtavlen in 1999.

References

Bibliography

 
 
 

Railway bridges in Viken
Road bridges in Viken
Bridges on the Østfold Line
European route E6 in Norway
Bridges completed in 1996
1996 establishments in Norway
Vestby